The AN/FPS-5 was a nodding height-finding radar used by the United States Air Force Air Defense Command. It was unique in that it used a fixed reflector and a moving feed in order to steer the beam. It was produced in the early 1950s by Hazeltine, and deployment was limited. It was normally used with the AN/FPS-3 search radar.

The Japanese  radar is a modern 3-dimensional AESA (Active Electronical Scanned Array) radar. Though both have a similar designation, there is no relationship between the systems.

References

 AN/FPS-5 @ radomes.org
 Winkler, David F. (1997), Searching the skies: the legacy of the United States Cold War defense radar program. Prepared for United States Air Force Headquarters Air Combat Command.

External links

Ground radars
Radars of the United States Air Force
Height-finding radars
Military equipment introduced in the 1950s